Divina Providência ("divine providence") is a bairro in the District of Sede in the municipality of Santa Maria, in the Brazilian state of Rio Grande do Sul. It is located in north Santa Maria.

Villages 
The bairro contains the following villages: Divina Providência, Vila Brenner, Vila Km 2, Vila São João Batista.

References 

Bairros of Santa Maria, Rio Grande do Sul